Scandium(III) hydroxide is an inorganic compound with the chemical formula Sc(OH)3, the trivalent hydroxide of scandium. It is an amphoteric compound. It is slightly soluble in water, and its saturated solution (pH = 7.85) contains Sc(OH)3 and a small amount of Sc(OH)2+. The solubility of scandium(III) hydroxide in water is 0.0279 mol/L. It will convert to ScO(OH) after aging, greatly reducing the solubility (0.0008 mol/L). Scandium(III) hydroxide can be produced by reacting scandium salts and alkali hydroxides. In the reaction, different starting ingredients can generate different intermediates such as Sc(OH)1.75Cl1.25, Sc(OH)2NO3 and Sc(OH)2.32(SO4)0.34.

References

Scandium compounds
Hydroxides